The Primera B de Chile season was the 59th completed season of the Primera B de Chile in the Chilean football league system.

Torneo Apertura

Unión San Felipe was tournament’s champion.

Torneo Clausura

San Luis de Quillota was tournament’s champion.

Final of Champions
In order to determine the 2nd promoted team to Primera División, the two best teams from both Apertura and Clausura tournaments will face in a two-legged tie. The winning team will be promoted, while the losing team will qualify to the promotion play-offs.

As Apertura winners Unión San Felipe were already promoted due to the overall table (77 pts.), their spot was awarded to Santiago Wanderers, which were finished in 2nd place. San Luis de Quillota had their spot granted as Clausura winners.

Santiago Wanderers won 3–2 on aggregate and were promoted to Primera División.

Promotion play-offs
San Luis de Quillota, as losers of the Final of Champions, and San Marcos de Arica, 4th place of the overall table, faced Palestino and Curicó Unido, placed 15th and 16th in Primera División respectively, for the final two spots to the top-flight division. The play-offs were split into two draws involving a Primera Disivión team against a Primera B team, in two-legged ties.

Draw A

San Luis de Quillota won 4–2 on aggregate and were promoted to Primera División. Curicó Unido were relegated to Primera B.

Draw B

2–2 on aggregate. Palestino won 4–2 on penalties and remain in Primera División. San Marcos de Arica remain in Primera B.

References

External links
 RSSSF 2009

Primera B de Chile seasons
Primera B